Tu Hwnt i'r Bont ('Beyond the Bridge') is a 15th-century grade II listed building in the Community of Llanrwst, in the county of Conwy, in north Wales.
It is situated on the left bank of the River Conwy across Pont Fawr ('Big Bridge') from the town of Llanrwst.

Originally built as a farmhouse, Tu Hwnt i’r Bont is actually considerably older than the Inigo Jones bridge it stands beside. Some years later, during the 16th century, the building was used as the Courthouse for the surrounding area.

Over the centuries Tu Hwnt i’r Bont has fallen into disrepair several times and been rebuilt and restored. During the last century, Tu Hwnt i’r Bont was acquired by the National Trust who have since leased the building for over 50 years.

A decision was made by the original leaseholder, over half a century ago, to turn Tu Hwnt i’r Bont into a traditional Welsh Tea Rooms.

References

Grade II listed buildings in Conwy County Borough
Houses in Conwy County Borough
Houses completed in the 15th century